The Laurence Olivier Award for Best Actress in a Supporting Role in a Musical is an annual award presented by the Society of London Theatre in recognition of achievements in commercial London theatre. The awards were established as the Society of West End Theatre Awards in 1976, and renamed in 1984 in honour of English actor and director Laurence Olivier.

This award was created in 2015, along with the Best Actor in a Supporting Role in a Musical, to replace the singular award for Best Performance in a Supporting Role in a Musical, which existed from 1991 to 2014.

Winners and nominees

2010s

2020s

See also
 Laurence Olivier Award for Best Performance in a Supporting Role in a Musical
 Tony Award for Best Featured Actress in a Musical

References

External links
 

Actress
Theatre acting awards
Awards for actresses